Wang I-hsien (born 20 December 1980) is a Taiwanese taekwondo practitioner. 

She won a silver medal in heavyweight at the 2001 World Taekwondo Championships, after being defeated by Sin Kyung-hyen in the final. She won a gold medal at the 2002 Asian Games, by defeating Youn Hyun-jung in the final.

References

External links

1980 births
Living people
Taiwanese female taekwondo practitioners
Taekwondo practitioners at the 2002 Asian Games
Asian Games medalists in taekwondo
Medalists at the 2002 Asian Games
Asian Games gold medalists for Chinese Taipei
World Taekwondo Championships medalists
21st-century Taiwanese women